An Alevi and sunni religious leader related to a Dede in Sufism.

List of Notable Babas
 Arabati Baba Teḱe
 Demir Baba Teke
 Gül Baba
 Otman Baba

Turkish culture
Alevism
Islam in Turkey
Shia Islam in Turkey